Suh Sung (born 3 April 1945) is a Zainichi Korean academic and writer. He was previously a Professor of International Studies at Ritsumeikan University and a research advisor at the Ritsumeikan Center for Korean Studies. His specializations include contemporary Korean law and politics, human rights law in East Asia, and comparative human rights law.

Born in Kyoto to Zainichi Korean parents, Suh spent his early life in Japan before moving to South Korea to continue his postgraduate studies. In 1971, after returning from a trip to Japan to see his family, Suh was arrested by South Korean authorities and accused of being a North Korean spy. He was subsequently sentenced to life imprisonment and spent the next 19 years in prison before being released in 1990.

Biography 
Suh was born on 3 April 1945 in Kyoto, Japan, to Zainichi Korean parents. He received his elementary and secondary school education in Japan, and graduated from Tokyo University of Education in March 1968. Suh then travelled to South Korea to continue his studies at the Graduate School of Sociology at Seoul National University, during the regime of Park Chung-hee.

On 18 April 1971, shortly after returning to South Korea from a trip to Japan to see his family, Suh was arrested on suspicion of being a North Korean spy and sentenced to life imprisonment. While in custody and under heavy interrogation and torture, Suh lit himself on fire but survived with severe burns to his face. Suh's sentenced was reduced to 20 years on 21 December 1988, and he was released on 28 February 1990, after being imprisoned for nearly 19 years. He has been described as a political prisoner.

Suh was a Professor of International Studies at Ritsumeikan University in Japan from 1998 to 2018. His autobiography Unbroken Spirits: Nineteen Years in South Korea's Gulag details his experience as a political prisoner.

References

External links
Alvin L. Jacobson, South Korean Sociologist Imprisoned,  Footnotes (American Sociological Association) 16 (January): 8. 

1945 births
People from Kyoto
Academic staff of Ritsumeikan University
Living people
Prisoners and detainees of South Korea